Fateh Khaliq is a Pakistani politician who had been a member of the Provincial Assembly of the Punjab from August 2018 till January 2023. He is the son of veteran politician and landlord Malik Khaliq Dad Bandial.

Political career

He was elected to the Provincial Assembly of the Punjab as a candidate of Pakistan Tehreek-e-Insaf from Constituency PP-82 (Khushab-I) in 2018 Pakistani general election.

References

Living people
Punjab MPAs 2018–2023
Pakistan Tehreek-e-Insaf MPAs (Punjab)
Year of birth missing (living people)